David Winters (April 5, 1939 – April 23, 2019) was an English-American  actor, dancer, choreographer, producer, film distributor, director and screenwriter. Winters participated in over 150 television series, television specials, and motion pictures. His accolades include two Emmy Award nominations, a Peabody Award, a Christopher Award, and many more. At a young age, he was seen acting in film and television projects such as Lux Video Theatre, Naked City, Mister Peepers, Rock, Rock, Rock, and Roogie's Bump. He received some attention in Broadway musicals for his roles in West Side Story (1957) and Gypsy (1959). In the film adaptation of West Side Story (1961) he was cast as A-rab. It became the highest grossing motion picture of that year, and won 10 Academy Awards, including Best Picture.

While Winters continued acting, he gained recognition for his dance choreography. He was frequently seen on television with his troupe David Winters Dancers in various variety shows most notably Hullabaloo (1965-1966) where he'd choreograph popularized several dances in the 1960s. He was a common collaborator of Elvis Presley and Ann-Margret including their hit film Viva Las Vegas (1964). Other dance choreography credits include T.A.M.I. Show (1964), Send Me No Flowers (1964), Billie (1965), and A Star Is Born (1976). For the TV movie Movin' with Nancy (1967), his choreography was nominated in the category Special Classification of Individual Achievements at the Emmys.

Winters eventually became a director and a producer starting with a streak of star-studded TV specials including Raquel! (1970) and Once Upon a Wheel (1971). His first theatrical release was the concert film Alice Cooper: Welcome to My Nightmare (1975) and his second the sport comedy Racquet (1979). He also directed The Last Horror Film (1982), starring Joe Spinell. Another directorial effort was the teenage romance skateboarding film Thrashin (1986), starring Josh Brolin. In the mid 1980s, Winters opened his own production and distribution specializing in action films company, Action International Pictures. Up to the mid-2000s Winters continued producing films.

In his final years Winters continued acting most notably the television series Blackbeard (2006) and the film Teddy Bear (2012). He produced the historical epic The King Maker (2005). He also produced, directed, and co-starred in Welcome 2 Ibiza (2003) and Dancin': It's On! (2015).

Stage

Actor 

 Shinbone Alley
 West Side Story
 Gypsy
 One More River.

Associate director 

 Of Love Remembered

Director and choreographer 

 Goosebumps.

Selected filmography

Actor 

 Studio One (1950, TV Series) - Tom Boyne (uncredited)
 The United States Steel Hour (1954, TV Series)
 Roogie's Bump (1954) - Andy
 Rock, Rock, Rock! (1956) - Melville
 Naked City (1958, TV Series) - Marty Nemo
 The Last Angry Man (1959) - Lee Roy (uncredited)
 West Side Story (1961) - A-rab (Jets)
 The Detectives Starring Robert Taylor (1961, TV Series) - Billy Joe Temple
 Take Her, She's Mine (1963) - Lester (uncredited)
 Captain Newman, M.D. (1963) - Patient (uncredited)
 The New Interns (1964) - Hood
 Burke's Law (1965, TV Series) - Special Agent James Martin (uncredited)
 The Crazy-Quilt (1966)
 Love on a Rooftop (1967, TV Series) - Augie
 The Last Horror Film (1982) - Stanley Kline
 Welcome 2 Ibiza (2003) - Uncle Sam
 Blackbeard (2006, TV Mini-Series) - Silas Bridges
 Hanuman klook foon (2008) - Stephan
 Teddy Bear (2012) - Scott
 Dragonwolf (2013) - Brutus
 Dancin': It's On! (2015) - Hal Sanders (final film role)

Choreographer 

 Viva Las Vegas (1964)
 T.A.M.I. Show (1964)
 Send Me No Flowers (1964)
 Pajama Party (1964)
 Shindig! (1964)
 Girl Happy (Uncredited, 1965)
 Tickle Me (1965)
 Billie (1965)
 Bus Riley's Back in Town (1965)
 Kitten with a Whip (1965)
 Hullabaloo (1965)
 Made in Paris (1966)
 Lucy in London (1966)
 MJ's (1966)
 The Swinger (1966)
 Go (1967)
 Movin' with Nancy (1967)
 Monte Carlo: C'est La Rose (1968)
 Ann-Margret: From Hollywood with Love (1969)
 The Spring Thing (1969)
 The Special London Bridge Special (1972)
 A Star Is Born (1976)
 Star Wars Holiday Special (1978)
 Roller Boogie (1979)
 Diana (1981)

Director/Producer/Writer

Film 

Executive producer only

Television

Video

References 

Director filmographies
Male actor filmographies